Pan Long Wan is a village of the Clear Water Bay Peninsula, in Sai Kung District, New Territories, Hong Kong.

Administration
Pan Long Wan is a recognized village under the New Territories Small House Policy.

See also
 Fat Tong Chau

References

External links
 Delineation of area of existing village Pan Long Wan (Hang Hau) for election of resident representative (2019 to 2022)

 

Villages in Sai Kung District, Hong Kong